Kim Sinclair (born 10 July 1954) is an Academy Award-winning art director and production designer from New Zealand. He won the Oscar during the 82nd Academy Awards for Best Art Direction for the film Avatar. He shared it with Rick Carter and Robert Stromberg.

Selected filmography
Slow West (2015) 
The Dark Horse (2014)
Man of Steel (2013)
The Adventures of Tintin (2011)
Avatar (2009)
Black Sheep (2006)
The Legend of Zorro (2005)
The Last Samurai (2003)
Beyond Borders (2003)
Cast Away (2000)

References

External links

 NZ On Screen biography

1954 births
Living people
Best Art Direction Academy Award winners
Best Production Design BAFTA Award winners
People from Auckland
Set decorators